Uzma is a female name used in mostly Pakistan, India, and Iran.

Notable people with the name include:

Uzma Aslam Khan, Pakistani writer
Uzma Alkarim, Pakistani television news anchor, programme host and producer
Uzma Gillani, Pakistani actress and advertiser
Uzma Gondal, Pakistani cricketer
Uzma Khan, Pakistani actress and model
Uzma Khan (politician), Pakistani politician
Uzma Qadri, Pakistani politician

See also

Pakistani feminine given names
Indian feminine given names
Iranian feminine given names